Kauno Jėgeriai founded in 1993, was a Lithuanian football team based in Kaunas city. It was a farm-team of FBK Kaunas.

த.சி.சதாசிவம்
  
 5 –

Participation in Lithuanian Championships
 2005 – 2nd (1 Lyga)
 2004 – 2nd (1 Lyga)
 2003 – 7th (1 Lyga)

Association football clubs established in 1993
1993 establishments in Lithuania
Defunct football clubs in Lithuania
2008 disestablishments in Lithuania
Association football clubs disestablished in 2008